Warthermarske is a hamlet in the Harrogate borough of North Yorkshire, England. The village is not far from the River Ure, which eventually runs through the small city of Ripon, which itself is a few miles south-east of Warthermarske.

The village is at the southern corner of the Swinton Park Estate and was formerly included with the village of Swinton as one township.

The hamlet used to be known as Wardenmask and its name derives from Old English with a Scandinavian influence; Wardonmersk which means Marsh at a Watch-Hill.

References

External links

Villages in North Yorkshire